The All-Japan Trade Union Congress (Zenro) was a national trade union federation in Japan.

The federation was established in 1954 by a number of unions on the right-wing of the trade union movement, who had become unhappy with the increasingly left-wing stance of the General Council of Trade Unions of Japan, and others from the Japanese Federation of Labour.  In 1964, it merged with the National Council of Government and Public Workers' Unions and the Japanese Federation of Labour, to form the Japanese Confederation of Labour.

Affiliates
The following unions were affiliated in 1956.

Leadership
President: Minoru Takita
General Secretary: Haruo Wada

References

National trade union centers of Japan
Trade unions established in 1954
Trade unions disestablished in 1964